The 1984 United States Senate election in Idaho was held on November 6, 1984. 

Incumbent Senator James A. McClure was re-elected to a third term in office.

Republican primary

Candidates
 James A. McClure, incumbent Senator

Results
Senator McClure was unopposed for re-nomination by the Republican Party.

Democratic primary

Candidates
 Peter M. Busch, Vietnam War veteran
 Louis Hathaway

Results

Independents and third parties

Libertarian
 Donald Billings

General election

Campaign
The campaign was largely uneventful given McClure's large lead in polls and the Republican tendency of Idaho.

During the campaign, Democratic candidate Peter Busch was involved in a minor plane crash. Busch would die in a similar crash while campaigning for Congress in 1986.

Results

See also 
 1984 United States Senate elections

References 

1984
Idaho
United States Senate